Windows NT 3.5 is a major release of the Windows NT operating system developed by Microsoft and oriented towards businesses. It was released on September 21, 1994, as the successor to Windows NT 3.1 and the predecessor to Windows NT 3.51.

One of the primary goals during Windows NT 3.5 development was to improve the operating system's performance. As a result, the project was codenamed "Daytona", after the Daytona International Speedway in Daytona Beach, Florida.

On December 31, 2001, Microsoft declared Windows NT 3.5 obsolete and stopped providing support and updates for the system.

Features
Windows NT 3.5 comes in two editions: NT Workstation and NT Server. They respectively replace the NT and NT Advanced Server editions of Windows NT 3.1. The Workstation edition allows only 10 concurrent clients to access the file server and does not support Mac clients.

Windows NT 3.5 includes integrated Winsock and TCP/IP support. (Its predecessor, Windows NT 3.1, only includes an incomplete implementation of TCP/IP based on the AT&T UNIX System V "STREAMS" API.) TCP/IP and IPX/SPX stacks in Windows NT 3.5 are rewritten. NetBIOS over TCP/IP (NetBT) support as a compatibility layer for TCP/IP was introduced as also the Microsoft DHCP and WINS clients and DHCP and WINS servers.

Windows NT 3.5 can share files via the File Transfer Protocol, and printers through the Line Printer Daemon protocol. It can act as a Gopher, HTTP, or WAIS server, and includes Remote Access Service for remote dial-up modem access to LAN services using either SLIP or PPP protocols. Windows NT 3.5 Resource Kit includes the first implementation of Microsoft DNS.

Other new features in Windows NT 3.5 include support for the VFAT file system, Object Linking and Embedding (OLE) version 2.0 and support for input/output completion ports. Microsoft updated the graphical user interface to be consistent with that of Windows for Workgroups 3.11. NT 3.5 shows performance improvements over NT 3.1, and requires less memory.

Limitations
A lack of drivers for PCMCIA cards limited NT 3.5's suitability for notebook computers.

To install Windows NT 3.5 on a computer that has a sixth-generation or later x86 processor, one has to modify files on the installation CD-ROM.

Reception
In July 1995, Windows NT 3.5 with Service Pack 3 was rated by the National Security Agency as complying with Trusted Computer System Evaluation Criteria (TCSEC) C2 criteria.

Source code 
In May 2020, the full source code for the second release candidate build (build 782.1) of Windows NT 3.5, along with source code for the original Xbox leaked onto the Internet. Microsoft stated it had nothing to share about the leaks.

References

External links
 Guidebook: Windows NT 3.51 Gallery – A website dedicated to preserving and showcasing Graphical User Interfaces

1994 software
Products and services discontinued in 2001
3.5
IA-32 operating systems
MIPS operating systems